Robert Manzon (12 April 1917 – 19 January 2015) was a French racing driver. He participated in 29 Formula One World Championship Grands Prix, debuting on 21 May 1950. He achieved two podiums, and scored a total of 16 championship points. At the time of his death, Manzon was the last surviving driver to have taken part in the first Formula One World Championship in 1950.

Career
Manzon began his career as a mechanic and after World War II he started racing, initially with a Cisitalia D46. Earning a contract with the Gordini team for 1948, Manzon won some minor races although his machinery was not always reliable.

He continued with Gordini into the new Formula One era, scoring points at the 1950 French Grand Prix, and finishing sixth in the World Drivers' Championship in 1952, taking third place in the 1952 Belgian Grand Prix. He left Gordini in 1953 and joined Louis Rosier's team, which was campaigning Ferraris. He subsequently achieved his second podium at the 1954 French Grand Prix at the wheel of a Ferrari 625.

Manzon then returned to the Gordini team, but found little success in World Championship events. Outside the Championship, he won the 1956 Naples Grand Prix and a sports car race at Pescara.

After racing, he later operated his own diesel equipment distribution business. 

Manzon died at his home in the south of France on 19 January 2015 aged 97. He was the last surviving entrant of the 1950 Formula One season.

Complete Formula One World Championship results
(key)

References

Sources
Profile at www.grandprix.com
Robert Manzon's obituary

1917 births
2015 deaths
French racing drivers
French Formula One drivers
Gordini Formula One drivers
Ecurie Rosier Formula One drivers
Ferrari Formula One drivers
24 Hours of Le Mans drivers
12 Hours of Reims drivers
World Sportscar Championship drivers
Sportspeople from Marseille